Year 1469 (MCDLXIX) was a common year starting on Sunday (link will display the full calendar) of the Julian calendar.

Events 
<onlyinclude>

January–December 
 February 4 –  Battle of Qarabagh: Uzun Hasan decisively defeats the Timurids of Abu Sa'id Mirza.
 July 24 – Battle of Edgcote: Yorkists are defeated and, in the aftermath, King Edward IV of England is taken prisoner.
 August–October – Caister Castle in England is besieged by John de Mowbray, 4th Duke of Norfolk.
 October 19 – Ferdinand II of Aragon marries Isabella I of Castile in Valladolid, bringing about a dynastic union.

Date unknown 
 Sigismund of Austria sells Upper-Elsass (Alsace) to Charles the Bold, in exchange for aid in a war against the Swiss.
 Moctezuma I, Aztec ruler of Tenochtitlan, dies and is succeeded by Axayacatl.
 Anglo-Hanseatic War breaks out.
 Marsilio Ficino completes his translation of the collected works of Plato, writes Commentary on Plato's Symposium on Love, and starts to work on Platonic Theology.

Births 
 February 13 – Elia Levita, Renaissance Hebrew grammarian (d. 1549)
 February 20 – Thomas Cajetan, Italian philosopher (d. 1534)
 March 20 – Cecily of York, English princess (d. 1507)
 November 29 – Guru Nanak, Indian Sikh guru (d. 1539)
 April 29 – William II, Landgrave of Hesse (d. 1509)
 May 3 – Niccolò Machiavelli, Italian historian and political author (d. 1527)
 May 31 – King Manuel I of Portugal (d. 1521)
 June 20 – Gian Galeazzo Sforza, Duke of Milan (d. 1494)
 August 4 – Margaret of Saxony, Duchess of Brunswick-Lüneburg (d. 1528)
 August 26 – King Ferdinand II of Naples (d. 1496)
 date unknown
 John III of Navarre (d. 1516)
 Silvio Passerini, Italian politician (d. 1529)
 Laura Cereta, Italian humanist and feminist (d. 1499)
 probable – Vasco da Gama, Portuguese explorer (d. 1524)

Deaths 
 May 30 – Lope de Barrientos, powerful Castilian bishop and statesman  (b. 1382)
 August 12 – Richard Woodville, 1st Earl Rivers (executed) (b. 1405)
 September 25 – Margaret of Brittany, Breton duchess consort (b. 1443)
 October 8/10 – Filippo Lippi, Italian artist (b. 1406)
 December 2 – Piero di Cosimo de' Medici, ruler of Florence (b. 1416)
 December 31 – King Yejong of Joseon (b. 1450)
 date unknown
 Abu Sa'id Mirza, ruler of Persia and Afghanistan (b. 1424)
 Niccolò Da Conti, Italian merchant and explorer (b. 1395)
 Andrew Gray, 1st Lord Gray (b. c. 1390)
 Moctezuma I, Aztec ruler of Tenochtitlan, son of Huitzilihuitl (b. 1390)

References